Dawson Creek Airport  is located  southeast of Dawson Creek, British Columbia, Canada.

See also
Dawson Creek Water Aerodrome
Dawson Creek (Flying L Ranch) Airport

References

External links

Page about this airport on COPA's Places to Fly airport directory

Certified airports in British Columbia
Dawson Creek